The Go Getter is a 1937 film directed by Busby Berkeley and starring George Brent, Anita Louise, and Charles Winninger. A determined discharged US Navy veteran succeeds in the lumber business.  The film was produced by Cosmopolitan Productions and released through Warner Bros.

Plot
When the US Navy rigid airship Macon is damaged in a storm and crashes into the water (as the real  did in 1935), helmsman Bill Austin stays with his commanding officer until the rest of the crew has gotten safely away. Bill loses a leg as a result of the crash and leaves the Navy.

He goes looking for employment, but jobs are scarce in San Francisco. He tries a lumber company run by Lloyd Skinner, interrupting a meeting between Skinner and his fiancee Margaret Ricks. Skinner orders him to leave his office. Matt Peasely, head of a shipping firm in the same building, is more polite, but the answer is still the same. Undeterred, Bill seeks out Cappy Ricks, the retired founder of both companies.

While waiting in the reception area, he encounters Margaret again. He assumes she is also a job seeker and makes a date with her, unaware she is Cappy's only offspring. She sees her father first, and asks him to give Bill a chance. Cappy, who is frustrated with the way Skinner and Peasely have been running the businesses he built up, is quite willing to countermand them. He and Skinner decide to give Bill the hardest task they can think of: selling a half million feet of unwanted skunk spruce Cappy bought years ago as a favor to a friend. Not only does Bill sell all of the spruce, he also generates orders for all of the lumber the company has and more, all in a single business trip across the western United States, forcing Cappy to send him to Seattle to buy the shortfall from a hard-negotiating competitor.

Meanwhile, Bill and Margaret fall in love. With his commission from his trip, he buys an engagement ring. When he tells Cappy of his plans, however, the widowed Cappy is adamantly opposed to losing Margaret's company. He and Skinner go ahead with the "blue vase" test, a test everybody has failed, including Skinner. Cappy telephones Bill and tells him he saw a vase he liked, but could not spare the time to purchase it. He gives Bill instructions to buy it whatever the cost and bring it to him at the railway station by eight o'clock. Cappy and Skinner have pre-arranged all sorts of obstacles to make the task impossible, but Bill overcomes them all, and by hocking Margaret's ring to help pay the $1000 price of the vase and persuading a Navy pilot friend (on his honeymoon night, no less) to fly him ahead of the already departed train, he succeeds. Cappy is so impressed, he offers Bill a promotion to manager of his Shanghai office.

When Bill insists on marrying Margaret immediately so she can accompany him, Cappy does his best to stop him. He buys up all the staterooms in the ship Bill is to take, but Bill and Margaret get married and manage to sneak aboard the ship anyway. Then Cappy receives word that his men have gone on strike, and they trust and will only negotiate with Bill. Cappy sends him an urgent radiogram. When the captain of the ship refuses Bill's request to turn around, Bill jumps overboard. Margaret follows him, and the captain drops a lifeboat. Cappy finds them rowing back to land.

Bill negotiates an end to the strike, and Cappy decides to send Skinner to Shanghai instead. For Cappy's sake, the couple agree to live in his mansion.

Cast

 George Brent as Bill Austin
 Anita Louise as Margaret Ricks
 Charles Winninger as Cappy Ricks
 John Eldredge as Lloyd Skinner
 Henry O'Neill as Commander Tisdale
 Joseph Crehan as Karl Stone
 Gordon Oliver as Luce
 Eddie Acuff as Bob Blair
 Willard Robertson as Matt Peasely
 Pierre Watkin as Browne
 Joan Valerie as Skinner's Secretary (as Helen Valkis)
 Herbert Rawlinson as Lester
 George Chandler as Business Card Printer
 Helen Lowell as Mrs. Luce
 Harry Beresford as M. M. Barker
 Minerva Urecal as Cappy Ricks' Secretary
 Mary Treen as Mrs. Blair

Reception
Ann Ross wrote in a short review in Maclean's magazine that "Charles Winninger’s energetic performance as Cappy keeps things moving".

References

External links
 
 
 
 

American business films
American romance films
American black-and-white films
Films based on short fiction
Films directed by Busby Berkeley
Films set in San Francisco
1930s business films
1930s romance films
1930s American films
Films scored by Bernhard Kaun
Films about veterans